Tresch is a surname. Notable people with the surname include:

J. B. Tresch (1773–1821), Luxembourgian composer
Walter Tresch (born 1948), Swiss alpine skier